Colopisthus is a genus of isopods belonging to the family Cirolanidae.

The species of this genus are found in Central America.

Species:

Colopisthus canna 
Colopisthus cavalier 
Colopisthus parvus 
Colopisthus ronrico 
Colopisthus tresesquinas

References

Isopoda